is a Japanese footballer. He is a midfielder who plays for Uthai Thani in Thai League 2.

He was educated at and played for Shizuoka Gakuen High School and Shizuoka Sangyo University.

After graduating from the university, he signed for Albirex Niigata (S) from the S.League in 2013.

Club career statistics

External links
Contract with Kento Nagasaki
 Kento Nagasaki renews contract
 Player profile on Albirex Niigata FC (S) official website

1990 births
Living people
Japanese footballers
Singapore Premier League players
Albirex Niigata Singapore FC players
Association football forwards
Japanese expatriate sportspeople in Thailand
Expatriate footballers in Thailand